Uogys is a river of  Telšiai County and Šiauliai County, northern Lithuania. It flows for 30 kilometres and has a basin area of 85 km².

It is a left-bank tributary of the Venta River.

See also
Avižlys, another left-bank tributary of the Venta which runs close by and almost parallel

References

 LIETUVOS RESPUBLIKOS UPIŲ IR TVENKINIŲ KLASIFIKATORIUS (Republic of Lithuania- River and Pond Classifications).  Ministry of Environment (Lithuania). Accessed 2011-11-11.

Rivers of Lithuania
Venta River basin
Akmenė District Municipality